Fløyen or Fløyfjellet is one of the "city mountains" in Bergen, Hordaland, Norway. The name could originate from fløystangen or a weather vane that was set up to indicate the direction of the wind for sailing ships. The view of the Bergen peninsula makes Fløyfjellet a popular attraction among tourists and locals alike.

Hiking 
There are several hiking options on Fløyen itself, or one can continue further on to Vareggen or over Vidden to Ulriken. Fløyfjellet provides signed hiking roads to Blåmannen, Rundemannen, and Sandviksfjellet. At midtfjellet at the foot of Blåmannen there is a kiosk called Brushytten.

The roads and paths down from Fløyen are floodlit in the winter months and are popular for sledding.

Fløibanen 

Fløibanen is an -long electric cable funicular that pulls two wagons between Fløyen and the station at Vetrlidsallmenningen in Bergen city centre. It also has three stations: Promsgate, Fjellveien and Skansemyren and it was opened in 1918. Since the opening Fløibanen has carried over 48 million people to and from Fløyfjellet. Over the past few years passenger numbers have averaged 1 million per year. Over the years, Fløibanen has cemented its position as Bergen's most popular tourist attraction and according to the Norwegian Council for Tourism, Fløibanen was Norway's fourth most visited tourist attraction in the 2001 summer season. Most of the traffic occurs in the summer months from May to September.

There is also a viewpoint. In 2002 the site was rebuilt for 46 million NOK, the viewpoint was extended and is called Fløytrappene. This is a broad staircase which goes from the station stop to Fløien Folkerestaurant. There are countless hiking paths, and there is one road intended for cars.

References

External links
 "Floyen.no"  Company site of the Funicalar company.
 "Bergenbyarkiv.no" "Encyclopedia about the history in Bergen. 
 Walks and hikes on Fløyen 

Mountains of Bergen
Tourist attractions in Bergen